Boy Trouble is a 1939 American film starring Charles Ruggles, Mary Boland, Donald O'Connor, and Billy Lee.

Plot
In the story, Sybil Fitch (Boland) adopts two orphan boys (O'Connor, Lee). Her husband (Ruggles) is infuriated. However, when the boys catch scarlet fever, he finds that he really does love them.

Cast
 Charles Ruggles as Homer C. Fitch
 Mary Boland as Sybil Fitch
 Donald O'Connor as Butch
 Joyce Mathews as Patricia Fitch
 John Hartley as Wyndham Wilson
 Billy Lee as Joe
 Andrew Tombes as Mr. Svively
 Dick Elliott as Dr. Benshlager
 Zeffie Tilbury as Mrs. Jepson
 Sarah Edwards as Mrs. Moots
 Harlan Briggs as Mr. Pike

External links

1939 films
1939 comedy-drama films
Paramount Pictures films
Films directed by George Archainbaud
American comedy-drama films
American black-and-white films
1930s English-language films
1930s American films